The Genée International Ballet Competition is an annual international classical ballet competition organised by the Royal Academy of Dance of London, England. It is named for Dame Adeline Genée, and was first held in London in 1931.
It is now to be renamed the Margot Fonteyn Ballet Competition.

References

Ballet competitions